WECO-FM (101.3 FM, "Today's Hot New Country") is a radio station broadcasting a country music format. Licensed to Wartburg, Tennessee, United States, the station is currently owned by Morgan County Broadcasting Company, Inc. and features programming from the Motor Racing Network. The station has obtained a construction permit from the FCC for a power increase to 10,500 watts as a Class C2 station. Antenna height above average terrain would also be increased to 325 meters.

History
The station was assigned the call sign WGTG on February 17, 1988. On April 24, 1989, the station changed its call sign to the current WECO-FM.

References

External links
 
 

ECO-FM
Country radio stations in the United States
Radio stations established in 1988